20th Century Masters – The Millennium Collection: The Best of Phil Ochs is a brief compilation of Phil Ochs later works on A&M Records. Focusing heavily on his debut for the label, Pleasures Of The Harbor, offering five of its eight tracks, it only offered two tracks from his other three studio albums and only one from his 1974 live album. These selections tend to de-emphasize the folk leanings of those later albums while embracing the more experimental leanings.

Track listing

References

Ochs, Phil
A&M Records compilation albums
Phil Ochs compilation albums
2002 greatest hits albums